Jorge Prado García (born 5 January 2001) is a Spanish professional motocross racer, twice Motocross World Champion (2018 and 2019 in MX2).

Career

At the age of three he started riding a motorcycle and at the age of six he started competing in the first races. He won his first race at seven. His family moved to Lommel, Belgium in 2012.

In 2016 he made his debut in the MX2 category, in the Belgian Grand Prix. In 2017, he was the first Spanish to win a motocross race in MX2, later winning the championship in 2018 and 2019. In 2020 he races in MXGP with KTM and the De Carli team, a top-level team with which Tony Cairoli has been racing for years. For 2022 Prado remained with De Carli but switched to GasGas when the team transitioned away from KTM.

Achievements
At 12 March 2023 Prado won 64 races and 36 GP in the Motocross World Championship.

References

External links
 Jorge Prado García at MXGP web site
 
 

Living people
2001 births
Spanish motocross riders
Sportspeople from Lugo